The Men's 62 kilograms event at the 2018 Asian Games took place on 21 August 2018 at the Jakarta International Expo Hall A.

Schedule
All times are Western Indonesia Time (UTC+07:00)

Records

Results
Legend
NM — No mark

References

External links
Weightlifting at the 2018 Asian Games

Men's 62 kg